Chengbei is a town in Fuchuan Yao Autonomous County, Guangxi, China.

Administrative division
As of 2016, the town is divided into eleven villages and one community:
 Chengbei Community
 Chengbei
 Liuhe
 Mashan
 Shishi
 Liayuan
 Siyuan
 Weifeng
 Xinzhai
 Ailing
 Fengling
 Limugang

History
In ancient China, it belonged to Fengsheng and Fu Zhou. In the Ming dynasty (1368–1644), it came under the jurisdiction of Jiudu. In the Qing dynasty (1644–1911), it was under the jurisdiction of Mashantuan. In the Republic of China, it belonged to Chaodong District.

Geography
The town lies at northwestern Fuchuan Yao Autonomous County, bordering Gongcheng Yao Autonomous County to the west, Chaodong Town and Jiangyong County to the north, and Gepo Town to the east.

The Fuchuan River flows north to south through the town.

Economy
The local economy is primarily based upon agriculture. The main crops of the town are grains, followed by tobacco and vegetables.

Tourist attractions
The Fengxi Yao Village is major touristic destination for locals and foreigners. 

The Chuanyan Karst Cave is a famous scenic spot in the town.

The town has two ancient bridges, the Chaoyang Wind-rain Bridge and Fushou Wind-rain Bridge, both were built in the Ming dynasty (1368–1644).

Transportation
The S13 Zhongshan County-Fuchuan County Expressway passes through the western town.

References

Bibliography

Towns of Hezhou